Taganrog is a port city in Rostov Oblast, Russia, on the north shore of the Taganrog Bay in the Sea of Azov, several kilometers west of the mouth of the Don River. Population:

History of Taganrog

The history of the city goes back to the late Bronze Age–early Iron Age (between the 20th and 10th centuries BC), when it was the earliest Greek settlement in the northwestern Black Sea Region and was mentioned by the Greek historian Herodotus as Emporion Kremnoi. 

In the 13th century, Pisan merchants founded a colony, Portus Pisanus, which was however short-lived. Taganrog was founded by Peter the Great on 12 September 1698. The first Russian Navy base, it hosted the Azov Flotilla of Catherine the Great (1770–1783), which subsequently became the Russian Black Sea Fleet. Taganrog was granted city status in 1775.

By the end of the 18th century, Taganrog had lost its importance as a military base after Crimea and the entire Sea of Azov were absorbed into the Russian Empire. In 1802, Tsar Alexander I granted the city special status, which lasted until 1887. In 1825, the Alexander I Palace in Taganrog was used as his summer residence, and he died there in November 1825. Also in Taganrog is the House of Teacher, a mansion where numerous artists have performed.

Although it had been bombarded and damaged by an Anglo-French fleet in 1855, Taganrog became important as a commercial port, used for the import of grain by the end of the 19th century until the early 20th century. Industrialization increased in the city when Belgian and German investors founded a boiler factory, an iron and steel foundry, a leather factory, and an oil press factory. By 1911, fifteen foreign consulates had opened in the city.

During World War I, Taganrog was occupied by the troops of the German Army from May to August 1918. In 1919, General Anton Denikin established his headquarters at the Avgerino mansion in the city while commanding White Russian troops fighting in South Russia during the Russian Civil War. When the White Russians were defeated and Bolshevik power was established in the city on 25 December 1919, Denikin's remaining troops and the British Consulate were evacuated by HMS Montrose. Full power was granted to the Executive Committee of The City Soviet Workers' council on 17 December 1920, and Taganrog briefly joined the Ukrainian SSR as the administrative center of Taganrog Okrug, until it was transferred to the Russian SFSR along with Shakhty Okrug on 1 October 1924. 

During World War II, Taganrog was occupied by National Socialist  Germany from 1941 to 1943 during Operation Barbarossa, when two SS divisions entered the city on 17 October 1941, followed by the Wehrmacht. The city suffered extensive damage. Under German occupation the local government system was replaced by a German-style Bürgermeisteramt (Mayor's Office), which governed the city until it was liberated by the Red Army on 30 August 1943.

Administrative and municipal status
Within the framework of administrative divisions, it is incorporated as Taganrog Urban Okrug—an administrative unit with the status equal to that of the districts. As a municipal division, this administrative unit also has urban okrug status.

Climate
The climate of Taganrog is temperate (Köppen climate classification Cfa). Taganrog experiences moderately cold (mild by Russian standards) winters and hot summers.

Economy

Taganrog is the leading industrial center of Rostov Oblast. Local industry is represented by aerospace, machine-building, automobile, military, iron and steel industry, engineering, metal traders and processors, timber, woodwork, pulp and paper, food, light, chemical and construction materials. The city is one of the major ports of the Sea of Azov.

The biggest company currently operating in Taganrog is Taganrog Iron & Steel Factory, (publicly traded company Tagmet), which manufactures steel, steel pipe, for oil and gas industry and consumer goods. The other major employer is Taganrog Auto Factory (TagAZ Ltd.), which originated from Taganrog Combine Harvester Factory. The plant manufactures automobiles licensed by Hyundai. The production line includes Hyundai Accent compact sedan, mid-size Hyundai Sonata, sport utility vehicle Santa Fe, and Hyundai Porter pickup truck. Taganrog is also home to the aircraft design bureau Beriev.

The area around Taganrog has a large industrial potential, a diversified agricultural industry, production plants, and a modern infrastructure. The location of Taganrog on the intersection of traffic routes and the seaport facilitate access to the emerging CIS markets.

Taganrog's main trading partners are the CIS countries, South Korea, Turkey, Italy, Greece, and Egypt.

Military

The city also hosts the Taganrog military museum.

Higher education
Taganrog College of Technologies
Taganrog State Pedagogical Institute
Taganrog College of Management and Economy

Culture

Taganrog in literature

Anton Chekhov featured the city and its people in many of his works, including Ionych, The House with an Attic, The Man in a Shell, Van'ka, Three Years, Mask, and My Life. It is believed that Taganrog may have been the Lukomorye (fairy tale land) in which Alexander Pushkin's Ruslan and Lyudmila (1820) was set. The city also appeared in the novels of Ivan Vasilenko and Konstantin Paustovsky and in the poems of Nikolay Sherbina and Valentin Parnakh.

The legend of "Elder Fyodor Kuzmich" is cited in the book Roza Mira by Russian mystic Daniil Andreyev. According to this legend, the Russian tsar Alexander I did not die in Taganrog, but instead left his crown and the status of monarch to continue his life as a traveling hermit.

In 2004 Sabine Wichert published a collection of poems titled Taganrog.

In Maria Kuncewiczowa's 1945 novel The Stranger (New York, LB Fischer publisher), the city of Taganrog plays an essential role as a place of nostalgic happiness for the uprooted Polish musician and matriarch, Rose.

Notable people

Numerous Russian and international aristocrats, politicians, artists, and scientists were born and/or have lived in Taganrog. Taganrog is the native city of 
Anton Chekhov, 
Faina Ranevskaya, 
Sophia Parnok, 
Alexandre Koyré, 
Isaac Yakovlevich Pavlovsky,
Witold Rowicki, 
Georgy Sedov (1877–1914), Russian Arctic explorer
Dmitri Sinodi-Popov

It is also associated with: 
Peter I of Russia,
Alexander I of Russia,
Cornelius Cruys, 
Giuseppe Garibaldi, 
Pyotr Tchaikovsky, 
Adolph Brodsky, 
Konstantin Paustovsky, 
Nestor Kukolnik, 
Achilles Alferaki, 
Ioannis Varvakis, 
Vasily Zolotarev, 
Sergei Bondarchuk, 
William Frederick Yeames

Twin towns – sister cities

Taganrog is twinned with:

 Antratsyt, Ukraine (2012)
 Badenweiler, Germany (2002)
 Cherven Bryag, Bulgaria (1963)
 Jining, China (2009)
 Khartsyzk, Ukraine (2009)
 Lüdenscheid, Germany (1991)
 Odessa, Ukraine

See also
Apostolopulo House
House of Laskin
House of Sinodi-Popov
Bust of Lenin (Taganrog)
Mariupol Cemetery
Taganrog Palace of Youth
Monument of Cathopoul
House of Zolotaryov
Memorable sign Barrier

References

Notes

Sources

External links
Taganrogcity.com: official City of Taganrog website—
Tagancity.ru: official website of Taganrog city—
Taganrog.su: unofficial website of Taganrog—
Taganrog State − Anton Chekhov Pedagogical Institute—
Soviet topographic map 1:100,000
Russ-yug.ru: Weather forecasts for Taganrog

 
Cities and towns in Rostov Oblast
Port cities and towns of the Azov Sea
Port cities and towns in Russia
Populated coastal places in Russia
Populated places established in 1698
1698 establishments in Russia
1698 establishments in Europe
Don Host Oblast
Greek colonies on the Black Sea coast